Ugyen Academy Football Club is a Bhutanese professional football club based in Punakha that competes in the Bhutan Premier League, the top level of Bhutanese football. They won the Bhutan National League title in 2013 and represented Bhutan in the 2014 AFC President's Cup.

History 

Ugyen Academy's first appearance in the national league was in the 2012–13 season, where they finished third behind eventual champions Yeedzin and Drukpol, and were involved in the season's highest scoring game, an 8–1 victory over Samtse. The following season they won the Bhutan National League, one point above Yeedzin, losing only once, 4–2 to Thimphu City. By winning the national league, Ugyen Academy were awarded Bhutan's berth in the 2014 AFC President's Cup, their first appearance in any form of continental competition. They were drawn in Group A for the group stage, along with Sheikh Russel of Bangladesh, KRL of Pakistan and Sri Lanka Air Force. All the matches were played in Sri Lanka, and Ugyen Academy lost all three matches without scoring and conceding eight goals.

Ugyen Academy again took part in the National League the following season. They suffered a mediocre start to the season, drawing with eventual winners Druk United and losing to then leaders Thimphu City to find themselves lying in fourth place at the halfway stage. The team rallied in the second half however, winning all their matches bar a loss to Druk Star to end the season in second place, narrowly losing out on both the title and qualification for the 2015 AFC Cup on goal difference to Druk United.

Honours 

Bhutan National / Premier League
Winners: 2013
Runners-up: 2014, 2020

Continental record 

AFC President's Cup
2014: 4th in Group stage

See also 
 Ugyen Academy

References 

Football clubs in Bhutan
Punakha District
Association football clubs established in 2002
2002 establishments in Bhutan